Havili is a surname.  Notable people with the surname include:

 Aisea Havili (born 1977), Tongan rugby union player
 David Havili (born 1994), New Zealand rugby union player
 Onehunga Havili (born 1996), Tongan rugby union player
 Siliva Havili (born 1993), Tongan rugby league player
 Silo Havili, Tongan boxer
 Stanley Havili (born 1987), American football player

Tongan-language surnames